Xu Shilin was the defending champion but chose to participate at the 2019 Shenzhen Longhua Open instead.

Elisabetta Cocciaretto won the title, defeating Victoria Bosio in the final, 6–3, 6–4.

Seeds

Draw

Finals

Top half

Bottom half

References

Main Draw

Copa LP Chile Hacienda Chicureo - Singles